Kirchneriella is a genus of green algae in the family Selenastraceae.

The genus name of Kirchneriella is in honour of Emil Otto Oskar von Kirchner (1851–1925), who was a German botanist and agronomist.

The genus was circumscribed by Wilhelm Schmidle in Ber. Naturf. Ges. Freiburg vol.7 on page 82 in 189.

Known species
According to GBIF;
 Kirchneriella aperta 
 Kirchneriella arcuata 
 Kirchneriella dianae 
 Kirchneriella incurvata 
 Kirchneriella irregularis 
 Kirchneriella lunaris 
 Kirchneriella obesa 
 Kirchneriella obesa 
 Kirchneriella pinguis 
 Kirchneriella roselata

References

External links

Sphaeropleales genera
Sphaeropleales